The Stannary Palace, also known as the Duchy Palace, circa 1265–1300, was a complex of buildings constructed by the Earls of Cornwall as the centre of their administration. The surviving exchequer hall is reputed to be the oldest non-ecclesiastical building in Cornwall. The much larger great hall, of which large parts remain, was built as a replica of Westminster Hall. Its original function was as a court and place of taxation dealing with the Cornish tin industry. The Earls of Cornwall and later, after 1337, the Dukes of Cornwall had their residence at Restormel Castle so the original name would have been the Stannary Hall or the Great Hall of Lostwithiel. After 1337 it was sometimes referred to as the Duchy Palace.

In 1265 Richard, Earl of Cornwall, second son of King John and brother of King Henry III, acquired Restormel Castle, the Borough of Lostwithiel and the town of Fowey, from the de Cardinan family. During this period Lostwithiel was the most important port of Cornwall and second only to Southampton along the South Coast. In 1273 Richard died and was succeeded by his son Edmund, who took occupation of Restormel Castle and built the Great Hall.

It also housed the smelting houses, the coinage hall for the stannaries and duchy. In this complex the stannary courts were held and the stannary prison located. Records state that the whole complex was built and completed between 1272 and 1300 and regarded as the finest and grandest buildings in Cornwall.

In 1338 the earldom was raised to a dukedom and the first duke was the Edward, the Black Prince. The building then became the administrative centre for the duchy and the only polling station for the whole of Cornwall.

The Cornish Stannaries were suspended as a consequence of the Cornish Rebellion of 1497. Henry VII restored them in return for a payment from the tin miners of the, at the time, enormous sum of £1,000, to support his war on Scotland. In addition to restoring the stannaries and pardoning the people who participated in the rebellion, Henry's Charter of Pardon of 1508 provided that no new laws affecting miners should be enacted without the consent of twenty-four stannators, six being chosen from each of the four stannaries at Lostwithiel, Launceston, Truro and Helston.

The 1508 Charter states, "No [Westminster] Act or Statute shall have effect in the Stannaries without the assent and consent of the twenty-four stannators." Acting in its capacity as appeal court for the colonies, the Judicial Committee of the Privy Council has declared that any reference to the stannaries means the whole of Cornwall.

Although England had its own London-based exchequer, the unabridged Charter of Pardon makes no less than ten separate references to the Lostwithiel exchequer; thus illustrating one aspect of the constitutional linkage between Stannary and Duchy.

In September 1644 AD, the English Civil War was at its height and the town of Lostwithiel was taken by the Earl of Essex who made it his headquarters. During the battle the town was badly damaged, the Great Hall sacked and burnt, destroying valuable records of the Shire and stannaries. The part known as the Exchequer Hall was the least damaged and this then became the Convocation Hall for the Stannaries and the Public Convocation.

In 1533, John Leland stated that “in Lostwithiel is the Shire Hall for Cornwall and it is the Shire town for Cornwall.” In 1585 John Norden, in his survey, stated the same. In 1495 Henry VII instructed Parliament to pass an Act that the Weights and Measures for Cornwall be placed at Lostwithiel and these weights are now part of the Old Borough Regalia.

The last tinners' parliament was held in the Hall in 1751 and in 1874 the Duchy offices were removed elsewhere. The whole building was sold to tradesmen of the town. The Convocation Hall became a drill hall. This is now owned by the Freemasons. Within the building in the upper anteroom, traces remain of a medieval rose window which was over the original south entrance. Original oak supports and timbers still exist.

At the north end of the building is the Duchy Coat of Arms of the fifteen bezants, circa 1650, and it is said to be the earliest Arms of the Duchy in this formation anywhere. On the apex of the hall roof is the Prince of Wales’ plume of feathers which was probably erected by the Black Prince when he paid his first visit to Lostwithiel and Restormel Castle in 1353. Today the buildings are used as dwellings, antique shop and printers.

The Duchy Palace (the building at the north end of the complex) was used as a Masonic Hall until it was purchased by the Prince's Regeneration Trust in late 2008. The trust has begun repairs, in consultation with the Cornwall Building Preservation Trust. The current tenants are Lostwithiel Town Band while other potential uses for the building are investigated.

See also

Revived Cornish Stannary Parliament
Cornwall (territorial duchy)
Kingdom of Cornwall
Stannary law
Stannary town
Battle of Lostwithiel

References

External links
Cornish Stannary Parliament
Tyr-Gwyr-Gweryn
Prince's Regeneration Trust

Buildings and structures in Cornwall
History of Cornwall
Mining in Cornwall
Military history of Cornwall
Medieval Cornwall
Industrial archaeological sites in Cornwall
Lostwithiel